Pony Island is a video game developed and published by Canadian indie developer Daniel Mullins. As a metafictional game, the game has the player interact with what appears to be an old arcade cabinet game called "Pony Island". The player soon discovers the game is corrupted by Lucifer himself, who is trying to claim the player's soul. The player is aided by the soul of a previous player who helps the player access Pony Island internal programming to get around the traps left by Lucifer and save not only his soul, but the many tormented souls that are trapped within the game's code.

Gameplay 
Pony Island is presented as a crude arcade game. It is primarily a point-and-click style adventure game, frequently referencing other user-interface metaphors, such as a simulated operating system. The player must explore the internal programming of the "Pony Island" arcade game in order to progress. At times, the player must play "Pony Island", a type of endless runner game with shoot 'em up elements, guiding a pony character through a grassy valley, avoiding obstacles and shooting enemies that might attack it. The "programming" of "Pony Island", as well as of the operating system, may be accessed by clicking on "portals" that appear on the screen, presenting the player with simplified pseudocode along with one or more boxes and visual instruction commands, such as "move down", "move left" or "repeat". On these screens, the player will be required to reorder the visual instructions as to modify how the "programming" will execute. This will either bypass any "corruptions" in the game's code, or in some cases "cheat" (for example raising their experience points) the game, in order to progress. The person that the player talks to within the game on messenger creates portals to the core files, of which can be interacted with. In one part of the game, there are 4 people, including the player: The Devil ("1U©iF#r"), CORRUPTED, h0peles$0ul, and you, Guest.

Development 
Prior to working on Pony Island, Daniel Mullins had just graduated from college and attempted to launch a game, Catch Monsters through Kickstarter during November 2014, but failed to raise sufficient funds, and instead found a programming job though still wanted to develop games.

Pony Island was primarily developed during the 48-hour Ludum Dare game jam in December 2014, in which the theme was "Entire Game On One Screen". The game placed high in both the Ludum Dare's Mood and Humor categories, and was featured in Zoe Quinn's top 10 games of 2014. Inspired by the positive reception, Mullins prepared the game on his off time from his job for release through Steam Greenlight, and subsequently published the game in January 2016.

Mullins wanted to create a game that defied players' expectations from standard game interfaces, and "flipping them upside down". Mullins had been intrigued with games that are "dark and mysterious", but also wanted to create something that felt like it was not meant to be played. Part of this last goal was accomplished by minimizing the amount of instruction that the game provided, particularly once the player began to reveal the internal code workings, but built these systems on familiar interfaces so that the player would have intuition on what to do. For example, in the pseudo-code sections of the game, he found that adding iconography for locks and keys for the commands the players could manipulate helped them to understand how to interact with the code without direct instruction. At the same time, Mullins wrote the language of the pseudocode to make the programming commands seem ominous as to make the player seem like they were "toying with a system that [one] may not fully understand". Mullins also built in fake error screens and messages through the Steam software that appeared to come from the player's friends, to further the unease that he wanted the players to feel while playing the game.

Mullins attributed part of the game's success to popular streamer PewDiePie, who had early on asked Mullins if he could post a Let's Play of Pony Island. Mullins believed this helped him to get the game voted on by players for Steam Greenlight.

Reception 

Pony Island has generally been well received by critics, praising it for being a metafiction on the nature of video games. The game holds an aggregated score of 86/100 on Metacritic based on 29 critic reviews. IGN awarded it a score of 9.0 out of 10, saying "Pony Island is a punk rock experiment in storytelling and game design that delights in toying with the player." Lizzy Finnegan of The Escapist compared the experience of playing Pony Island as what it might have been like playing Polybius, an urban legend of a video game cabinet used for mind control experiments, and is "psychological horror done so incredibly right".

On the success of Pony Island, Mullins announced his next game The Hex for a planned early 2017 release, but since was pushed to release on October 16, 2018. The Hex, like Pony Island, is a meta-fictional game where the player takes the role of an innkeeper to solve a murder mystery where the suspects are characters that represent specific video game genres.

References

External links 
 

2016 video games
Indie video games
Linux games
Video games about demons
Metafictional video games
MacOS games
Programming games
Video games about video games
Video games developed in Canada
Windows games
Action-adventure games
Single-player video games
Video games designed by Daniel Mullins